Datuk Peter Anthony (born 24 February 1971) is a Malaysian politician, singer and businessman who has served as the Member of Sabah State Legislative Assembly (MLA) for Melalap since May 2018. He served as State Minister of Infrastructure Development of Sabah in the Heritage Party (WARISAN) state administration under former Chief Minister Shafie Apdal from May 2018 to the collapse of the WARISAN administration in September 2020. He is also a founder of Asli Jati Engineering Sdn Bhd, a construction company involved in Universiti Malaysia Sabah tender scandal in 2014. He is a member of the Social Democratic Harmony Party (KDM), a party that is aligned with the ruling Gabungan Rakyat Sabah (GRS) coalition. He has also served as 1st and founding President of KDM since January 2022. He was independent after leaving WARISAN on 28 December 2021 along with Limbahau MLA Juil Nuatim before he formed KDM, a new local political party based in Sabah that would align with the ruling Gabungan Rakyat Sabah (GRS) coalition. He was Vice-President and a member of the WARISAN opposition party. He founded KDM, also a native based party in Tenom, Sabah on 28 January 2022 along with Juil.

Honours 
  :
  Commander of the Order of Kinabalu (PGDK) - Datuk (2018)

Election results

References

Malaysian politicians
1971 births
Living people